Mamangkhe     is a village development committee in the Himalayas of Taplejung District in the Province No. 1 of north-eastern Nepal. At the time of the 2011 Nepal census it had a population of 1,135 people living in 240 individual households. There were 519 males and 616 females at the time of census.

References

External links
UN map of the municipalities of Taplejung District

Populated places in Taplejung District